Mary Louise Hancock (July 5, 1920 – December 4, 2017) was a New Hampshire state senator, New Hampshire State Planning Director and was often referred to as the 'Grand Dame' and the 'Queen Bee' of New Hampshire politics. She is a long term resident of New Hampshire's capital city of Concord and was the first woman to be elected senator from the state's 15th district. She received both the Robert Frost Award and the Susan B. Anthony Award. She has received honorary degrees from Keene State College as well as Notre Dame College of New Hampshire. Hancock was a distant relative of famed revolutionary John Hancock. Hancock died on December 4, 2017 at the age of 97.

Mary Louise Hancock Day
In 2000, Governor Jeanne Shaheen proclaimed July 5, Hancock's birthday, to be Mary Louise Hancock Day throughout her home state of New Hampshire.

Lighting of the dome
On January 4, 1979 Hancock joined with then-New Hampshire governor Hugh Gallen to relight the golden dome atop the New Hampshire State House. The previous governor, Meldrim Thomson, Jr., had ordered the lights to remain off during his term. During Hancock's second term as a state senator she met with the newly elected Gallen, and together they flipped the switch in the first days of his governorship.

References

External links
 Official website

1920 births
2017 deaths
People from Franklin, New Hampshire
New Hampshire state senators
Women state legislators in New Hampshire
21st-century American women